Events from the year 1896 in Finland

Establishments 

 Northern Ostrobothnia museum
 Academic Engineers and Architects in Finland TEK

Events 

 Free Exhibitions, a free art exhibition, opened.

Births 

 19 August - Vilho Niittymaa, athlete (died 1979)
 2 December - Bruno Frietsch, sports shooter (died 1996)
 exact date unknown - George Arthur Kulmala, artist (died 1940)

Deaths
10 May - Antti Ahlström, businessman, founder of Ahlstrom Corporation, 68

References